The Poles in Lithuania, also called Lithuanian Poles, estimated at 183,000 people in the Lithuanian census of 2021 or 6.5% of Lithuania's total population, are the country's largest ethnic minority.

During the Polish–Lithuanian union, there was an influx of Poles into the Grand Duchy of Lithuania and the gradual Polonization of its elite and upper classes. At the end of the Polish–Lithuanian Commonwealth in 1795, almost all of Lithuania's nobility, clergy, and townspeople spoke Polish and adopted Polish culture, while still maintaining a Lithuanian identity. In the 19th century, the processes of Polonization also affected Lithuanian and Belarusian peasants and led to the formation of a long strip of land with a predominantly Polish population, stretching to Daugavpils and including Vilnius. The rise of the Lithuanian national movement led to conflicts between both groups. Following World War I and the rebirth of both states, there was the Polish–Lithuanian War, whose main focus was Vilnius and the nearby region. In its aftermath, the majority of the Polish population living in the Lithuanian lands found themselves within the Polish borders. However, interwar Lithuania still retained a large Polish minority. During World War II, the Polish population was persecuted by the USSR and Nazi Germany. Post-World War II, the borders were changed, territorial disputes were suppressed as the Soviet Union exercised power over both countries and a significant part of the Polish population, especially the best-educated, was forcefully transferred from the Lithuanian SSR to the Polish People's Republic. At the same time, a significant number of Poles relocated from nearby regions of Byelorussian SSR to Vilnius and Vilnius region. After Lithuania regained independence, Lithuania–Poland relations were tense in the 1990s due to alleged discrimination of the Polish minority in Lithuania.

Currently, the Polish population is grouped in the Vilnius region, primarily the Vilnius and Šalčininkai districts. In the city of Vilnius alone there are more than 85,000 Poles, who make up about 15% of the Lithuanian capital's population. Most Poles in Lithuania are Roman Catholic and speak Polish, although a minority of them speak Russian or Lithuanian, as their first language. Together with Vilnius City, Poles inhabits an area of approximately 4000 km2.

Statistics

According to the Lithuanian census of 2021, the Polish minority in Lithuania numbered 183,421 persons or 6.5% of the population of Lithuania. It is the largest ethnic minority in modern Lithuania, the second largest being the Russian minority. Poles are concentrated in the Vilnius Region. Most Poles live in Vilnius County (170,919 people, or 21% of the county's population); Vilnius, the capital of Lithuania, has 85,438 Poles, or 15.4% of the city's population. Especially large Polish communities are found in Vilnius District Municipality (46% of the population) and Šalčininkai District Municipality (76%).

Lithuanian municipalities with a Polish minority exceeding 15% of the total population (according to the 2021 census) are listed in the table below:

Top 10 cities by number of Poles:
Vilnius: 85,438
Šalčininkai: 4,930
Lentvaris: 2,859
Nemenčinė: 2,858
Eišiškės: 2,844
Pabradė: 2,681
Grigiškės: 2,518
Visaginas: 2,084
Trakai: 938
Švenčionys: 860

Languages
The adoption of Polish cultural features by the nobles, townspeople, and clergy in the Grand Duchy of Lithuania, combined with an influx of migrants from Poland, created a Lithuanian variant of the Polish language. The local variety of Polish called Polszczyzna Litewska became the native tongue of the Lithuanian nobility in the 18th century.

Out of the 234,989 Poles in Lithuania, 187,918 (80.0%) consider Polish to be their first language. 22,439 Poles (9.5%) speak Russian as their first language, while 17,233 (7.3%) speak Lithuanian. 6,279 Poles (2.7%) did not indicate their first language. The remaining 0.5% speak various other languages. The Polish regiolect spoken by Lithuanian Poles is classified under Northern Borderlands dialect. Most of Poles who live southwards of Vilnius speak a form of Belarusian vernacular called there "simple speech", that contains many substratical relics from Lithuanian and Polish.

Education

As of 1980, about 20% of Polish Lithuanian students chose Polish as the language of instruction at school. In the same year, about 60–70% of rural Polish communities chose Polish. However, even in towns with a predominantly Polish population, the share of Polish-language education was less than the percentage of Poles. Even though, historically, Poles tended to strongly oppose Russification, one of the most important reasons to choose Russian language education was the absence of a Polish-language college and university learning in the USSR, and during Soviet times Polish minority students in Lithuania were not allowed to get college/university education across the border in Poland. Only in 2007, the first small branch of the Polish University of Białystok opened in Vilnius. In 1980 there were 16,400 school students instructed in Polish. Their number declined to 11,400 in 1990. In independent Lithuania between 1990 and 2001, the number of Polish mother tongue children attending schools with Polish as the language of instruction doubled to over 22,300, then gradually decreased to 18,392 in 2005. In September 2003, there were 75 Polish-language general education schools and 52 which provided education in Polish in a combination of languages (for example Lithuanian-Polish, Lithuanian-Russian-Polish). These numbers fell to 49 and 41 in 2011, reflecting a general decline in the number of schools in Lithuania. Polish government was concerned in 2015 about the education in Polish.

History until 1990

Grand Duchy of Lithuania (before 1795) 

First Polish people in Lithuania were mainly enslaved war captives. Poles started to migrate to the Grand Duchy in more noticeable numbers after Christianization of the country and establishment of the union between Poland and Lithuania in 1385. In the 15th and 16th century, the Polish population in Lithuania was not large numerically, but the Poles enjoyed a privileged social status – they were found in highly regarded places and their culture was considered prestigious. With time Polish people became part of the local landowning class. Lithuanian nobles welcomed fugitive Polish peasants and settled them on uncultivated land, but they usually assimilated with Belarusians and Lithuanians peasants within few generations. In the 16th century, the largest concentrations of Poles in the GDL were located in Podlachia, the border areas of Samogitia, Lithuania and Belarus, and the cities of Vilnius, Brest, Kaunas, Grodno, Kėdainiai, and Nyasvizh. During that period, the royal and grand ducal courts were nearly entirely composed of Polish speakers. Polish quickly supplanted Ruthenian as the language of Lithuanian elite after the latter had switched to speaking Ruthenian and Polish at the beginning of the 16th century. Reformation gave another impetus to the spread of Polish, as the Bible and other religious texts were translated from Latin to Polish. Since the second half of the 16th century, Poles predominated in Protestant schools and printing houses in the Grand Duchy, and the life of local protestant congregations. There were also numerous Poles among the Jesuits residing in Lithuania.

The influx of Poles to the Grand Duchy of Lithuania significantly increased after the Union of Lublin. This population movement created a fertile ground for socio-cultural Polonization of Lithuanian territories. While Poles and foreigners were generally prohibited from holding public offices in the Grand Duchy, Polish people gradually gained this right through the acquisition of Lithuanian land. Poor nobles from the Crown rented land from local magnates. The number of Poles grew also in the towns, among others in Vilnius, Kaunas, and Grodno. Vilnius became the most important center of the Polish intelligentsia in the Grand Duchy, with Poles predominating in the city in the middle of the 17th century.

Already at the beginning of the 16th century Polish became the first language of the Lithuanian magnates. In the following century it was adopted by the Lithuanian nobility in general. Even the nobility of Samogitia used the Polish language already in the 17th century. The Polish language also penetrated other social strata: the clergy, the townspeople, and even the peasants. During the Commonwealth's period, a Polish-dominated territory started to be slowly formed in the Grand Duchy of Lithuania, such as Liauda, northeast of Kaunas (since the early 15th century). The Polish historian  estimated that by the end of the 18th century, Polish and Polonized people constituted 25% of the Grand Duchy's inhabitants.

Lithuania under Russian rule (1795–1918) 
Until the 1830s, Polish was the administrative language in the so called Western Krai, which included the territories of the Grand Duchy of Lithuania that were annexed by the Russian Empire. During the 19th century, Poles were the largest Christian population in Vilnius. They also predominated in the municipal government of the city in the earlier half of the 19th century. The Polish-language university was re-established in Vilnius in 1803 and closed in 1832. After the 1863 uprising, public use of the Polish language and teaching it to peasants, as well as possession of Polish books by the latter became illegal. Notwithstanding their varied ethnic roots, the members of szlachta generally opted for Polish self-identification in the course of the 19th century.

In the 19th century Polish culture was spreading among the lower classes of Lithuania, mainly in Dzūkija and to a lesser degree in Aukštaitija. Linguists distinguish between official Polish language, used in the Church and cultural activities, and colloquial language, closer to the speech of the common people. Inhabitants of a significant part of the Vilnius region used a variant of the Belarusian language, which was influenced mainly by Polish, referred to as "simple speech". It was a kind of "mixed language" serving as an interdialect of the cultural borderland. This language became a gateway to the progressive Slavization of the Lithuanian population. This led to the formation of a compact Polish language area between the Lithuanian and Belarusian language areas, with Vilnius as the center. The position of Vilnius as an important Polish cultural center influenced the development of national identities among Roman Catholic peasants in the region. The emergence of the Lithuanian national movement in the 1880s slowed down the process of Polonization of the ethnically Lithuanian population, but also cemented a sense of national identity among a significant portion of the Polish-speaking Lithuanian population. The feeling of a two-tier Lithuanian-Polish national identity, present throughout the period, had to give way to a clear national declaration.

Interwar period and Second World War (1918–1944) 
From 1918 to 1921 there were several conflicts, such as the activity of the Polish Military Organisation, Sejny uprising and a foiled attempt at a Polish coup of the Lithuanian government. As a result of the Polish–Lithuanian War and Żeligowski's mutiny the border between independent Lithuania and Poland was drawn more or less according to the linguistic division of the region. Nevertheless, many Poles lived in the Lithuanian state and a significant Lithuanian minority found itself within the Polish borders. The loss of Vilnius was a painful blow to Lithuanian aspirations and identity. The irredentist demand for its recovery became one of the most important elements of socio-political life in interwar Lithuania and resulted in the emergence of hostility and resentment against the Poles.

In interwar Lithuania, people declaring Polish ethnicity were officially described as Polonized Lithuanians who needed to be re-Lithuanized, Polish-owned land was confiscated, Polish religious services, schools, publications and voting rights were restricted. According to the Lithuanian census of 1923 (not including Vilnius and Klaipėda regions), there were 65,600 Poles in Lithuania (3.2% of the total population). Although according to Polish Election Committee in fact the number of Poles was 202,026, so about 10% of total population. The Poles were concentrated in the districts of Kaunas, Kėdainiai, Kaišiadorys and Ukmergė, in each of which they constituted 20–30% of the population. In 1919, Poles owned 90% of estates larger than 100 ha. By 1928, 2,997 large estates with a total area of 555,207 ha were parceled out, and 52,935 new farms were created in their place and given to Lithuanian peasants.

Many Poles in Lithuania were signed in as Lithuanians in their passports, and as a result, they also were forced to attend Lithuanian schools. Polish education was organized by the "Pochodnia". After the establishment of Valdemaras regime in 1926, 58 Polish schools were closed, many Poles were incarcerated, and Polish newspapers were placed under strict censorship. Poles also had difficult access to higher education. Over time, the Polish language was also removed from the Church and seminaries. The most tragic episode in the history of Poles in interwar Lithuania was an anti-Polish demonstration organized by the Lithuanian Riflemen's Union on May 23, 1930 in Kaunas, which turned into a riot.

A large portion of the Vilnius area was part of the Second Polish Republic during the interwar period, particularly the area of the Republic of Central Lithuania, which had a significant Polish speaking population.

Soviet period (1944–1990) 

During the World War II expulsions and shortly after the war, the Soviet Union, forcibly exchanged population between Poland and Lithuania. During 1945–1948, the Soviet Union allowed 197,000 Poles to leave to Poland; in 1956–1959, another 46,600 were able to leave. Ethnic Poles made up 80-91% of Vilnius population in 1944. All Poles in the city were required to register for resettlement. In most cases, the Soviet authorities blocked the departure of Poles who were interwar Lithuanian citizens and only 8.3% (less than 8,000) of those who registered for repatriation in Kaunas Region in 1945–1946 managed to leave for Poland.

In the 1950s the remaining Polish minority was a target of several attempted campaigns of Lithuanization by the Communist Party of Lithuania, which tried to stop any teaching in Polish; those attempts, however, were stopped by Moscow. The Soviet census of 1959 showed 230,100 Poles concentrated in the Vilnius region (8.5% of the Lithuanian SSR's population). The Polish minority increased in size, but more slowly than other ethnic groups in Lithuania; the last Soviet census of 1989 showed 258,000 Poles (7.0% of the Lithuanian SSR's population). The Polish minority, subject in the past to massive, often voluntary Russification and Sovietization, and recently to voluntary processes of Lithuanization, shows many and increasing signs of assimilation with Lithuanians.

In independent Lithuania

1990–2000 
When Lithuania declared its independence from the Soviet Union in 1990 large part of the Polish minority, still remembering the 1950s attempts to ban Polish, was afraid that the independent Lithuanian government might want to reintroduce the Lithuanization policies. Furthermore, some Lithuanian nationalists, notably the Vilnija organization which was founded in 1988, considered eastern Lithuania's inhabitants as Polonized Lithuanians. Due to their view of ethnicity as primordial, they argued that the Lithuanian state should work to restore their "true" identity. Although, many Poles in Lithuania do have Lithuanian ancestry, they considered themselves ethnically Polish.

According to the historian Alfred E. Senn, the Polish minority was divided into three main groups: Vilnius' inhabitants supported Lithuanian independence, the residents of Vilnius' southeastern districts and Šalčininkai were pro-Soviet, while the third group scattered throughout the country did not have a clear position. According to surveys from the spring of 1990, 47% of Poles in Lithuania supported the pro-Soviet Communist party (in contrast to 8% support among ethnic Lithuanians), while 35% supported Lithuanian independence.

In November 1988, Yedinstvo (literally "Unity"), a pro-Soviet movement that was against Lithuanian independence, was formed. Under Polish leadership and with Soviet support, the regional authorities in Vilnius and Šalčininkai region declared an autonomous region, the Polish National Territorial Region. The same Polish politicians later voiced support for the Soviet coup attempt of 1991 in Moscow.  Yedinstvo collapsed after the failure of the GKChP in the 1991 Soviet coup d'état attempt, which doomed any prospect of a return to Soviet rule. Simultaneously, after the August Coup's failure, the Polish autonomous region was immediately declared illegal by the Lithuanian government, which instituted direct rule in those areas, thus causing resentment among some residents. The Government of Poland, however, never supported the autonomist tendencies of the Polish minority in Lithuania.. Yedinstvo lost influence after the August 1991 Coup and since then it's inactive.

In April 1989, another more moderate organization of Lithuanian Poles, the Association of Poles in Lithuania (ZPL), was established. Its first leader was Jan Sienkiewicz. ZPL supported 1991 Lithuanian independence referendum. On 29 January 1991, Lithuanian government granted minorities right of schooling in their native language and use of it in official institutions. Nonetheless, still no Polish person was included in the central government, also local governments in Polish-speaking regions were suspended after some of its leaders backed August 1991 Coup, and in their place governors were appointed. In addition, a new Citizenship Law was enacted in December 1991, that granted citizenship to every person that lived in eastern Lithuania before 1940, if they didn't have citizenship of another country, thus excluding most Polish persons that emigrated to Poland after the war.

Such a situation caused an international uproar and tension in Polish–Lithuanian relations. Eventually, direct rule was lifted and local elections were organised in December 1992. The ZPL also strengthened its attitude, demanding that the Polish minority be granted a number of rights, such as the establishment of a Polish university, increasing the rights of the Polish language, increasing subsidies from the central budget, and others. ZPL took part in the 1992 parliamentary elections winning 2.07% of the votes and four seats in Seimas.

In 1994, Lithuanian parliament limited participation in local elections to political parties, which forced ZPL to establish Electoral Action for Lithuanian Poles (AWPL). AWPL quickly dominated local political scene. In January 1995 new Language Law was enacted which required representatives of local institutions to know Lithuanian language, also all secondary schools were required to teach Lithuanian.

Another source of conflict was the memory of World War II. Immediately after independence, former members of the Home Army established a veterans' club, but the Lithuanian courts refused to register it. It succeeded only in 1995 under the name of the Polish War Veterans' Club. It was not until 2004, after Lithuania joined the European Union, that the court allowed registration under the name of the Home Army Veterans' Club. Many Lithuanians viewed the Home Army as an anti-Lithuanian organization that committed crimes against the civilian population and had fought for Vilnius' inclusion in post-war Poland, while Poles saw the Home Army as a patriotic, anti-fascist organization.

Polish–Lithuanian relations eased only in 1994, when both countries signed a treaty of good neighborhood. The treaty protected rights of Polish minority in Lithuania and Lithuanian minority in Poland. It also defined nationality as a matter of individual choice, which was contrary to the definition popular among Lithuanian nationalists, and even to the definition given in Lithuania's National Minorities Right Law of 1989, which defined nationality as something inherited. The Treaty defined that to the Polish ethinic minority belongs persons who have Lithuanian citizenship, are of Polish origin or consider themselves to belong to the Polish nationality, culture and traditions as well as viewing the Polish language as their native language.

The situation of the Polish minority assumed international significance again in 1995 after the publication of a Council of Europe report prepared by a commission headed by György Frunda (the so-called "Frunda Report"), which criticized Lithuanian policy toward the Polish minority, particularly the lack of recognition of the Polish university. However, this did not significantly affect Lithuanian politics. In 1996, the special provisions that made an entry of ethno-political parties parliament easier were removed, and from then on they had to meet the usual electoral threshold. The restoration of property lost during the communist period was also a burning issue, which was implemented very slowly in the lands inhabited by Poles. Poles protested against the expansion of Vilnius' borders.

After 2000 
Current tensions arise regarding Polish education and the spelling of names. The United States Department of State stated, in a report issued in 2001, that the Polish minority had issued complaints concerning its status in Lithuania, and that members of the Polish Parliament criticized the government of Lithuania over alleged discrimination against the Polish minority. In recent years, the Lithuanian government budgets 40,000 litas (~€10,000) for the needs of the Polish minority (out of the 2 million Eur budget of the Department of National Minorities). In 2006 Polish Foreign Minister Stefan Meller asserted that Polish educational institutions in Lithuania are severely underfunded. Similar concerns were voiced in 2007 by a Polish parliamentary commission. According to a report issued by the European Union Fundamental Rights Agency in 2004, Poles in Lithuania were the second least-educated minority group in Lithuania. The branch of the University of Białystok in Vilnius educates mostly members of the Polish minority.

A report by the Council of Europe, issued in 2007, stated that on the whole, minorities were integrated quite well into the everyday life of Lithuania. The report expressed a concern with Lithuanian nationality law, which contains a right of return clause. The citizenship law was under discussion during 2007; it was deemed unconstitutional on 13 November 2006. A proposed constitutional amendment would allow the Polish minority in Lithuania to apply for Polish passports. Several members of the Lithuanian Seimas, including  and Andrius Kubilius, publicly stated that two members of the Seimas who represent Polish minority there (Waldemar Tomaszewski and Michal Mackiewicz) should resign, because they accepted the Karta Polaka.

Lithuanian constitutional law stipulates that everyone (not only Poles) who has Lithuanian citizenship and resides within the country has to write their name in the Lithuanian alphabet and according to the Lithuanian pronunciation; for example, the name Kleczkowski has to be spelled Klečkovski in official documents. Poles who registered for Lithuanian citizenship after dissolution of the Soviet Union were forced to accept official documents with Lithuanian versions of their names. On April 24, 2012 the European Parliament accepted for further consideration the petition (number 0358/2011) submitted by a Tomasz Snarski about the language rights of Polish minority, in particular about enforced Lithuanization of Polish surnames.

Representatives of the Lithuanian government demanded removal of illegally placed Polish names of the streets in Maišiagala, Raudondvaris, Riešė and Sudervė as by a Lithuanian law, all the street name signs must be in a state language. as by constitutional law all names have to be in Lithuanian. Tensions have been reported between the Lithuanian Roman Catholic clergy and its Polish parishioniers in Lithuania. The Seimas voted against foreign surnames in Lithuanian passports.

The situation is further escalated by extremist groups on both sides. Lithuanian extremist nationalist organization Vilnija seeks the Lithuanization of Poles living in Eastern Lithuania. The former Polish Ambassador to Lithuania, Jan Widacki, has criticised some Polish organizations in Lithuania as being far-right and nationalist. Jan Sienkiewicz has criticized Jan Widacki.

In late May 2008, the Association of Poles in Lithuania issued a letter, addressed to Lithuania's government, complaining about anti-minority (primarily,  rhetoric in media, citing upcoming parliamentary elections as a motive, and asking for better treatment of the ethnic minorities. The association has also filed a complaint with the Lithuanian prosecutor, asking for investigation of the issue.

Lithuania has not ratified the European Charter for Regional or Minority Languages. 60,000 Poles have signed a petition against an education system reform. A school strike was declared and suspended.

The Law on Ethnic Minorities lapsed in 2010.

In 2014 Šalčininkai District Municipality administrative director Bolesław Daszkiewicz was fined €12,453 for failure to execute a court ruling to remove Lithuanian-Polish street signs. Lucyna Kotłowska was fined €1,738 for the same offense.

Difficulties of the Polish minority

Discrimination

There are opinions in some Polish media that the Polish minority in Lithuania is facing discrimination. As mentioned above, Petition 0358/2011 on language rights of Poles living in Lithuania was filed with the European Parliament in 2011. Polish Election Action in Lithuania claimed that the education legislation is discriminatory. In 2011, former Polish President Lech Wałęsa criticized the government of Lithuania over its alleged discrimination against the Polish minority.

  Lithuania continued to enforce the Lithuanized spelling of surnames of Poles in Lithuania, with some exceptions, in spite of the 1994 Polish–Lithuanian agreement, Lithuanian legislative system and the Constitution, see section "Surnames" for details.

The refusal of Lithuanian authorities to install bilingual road signs (against the legislative base of Lithuania) in areas densely populated by Lithuanian Poles is at times described by the Electoral Action of Poles in Lithuania and some Polish media as linguistic discrimination. The removal of illegally-placed Polish or bilingual street signs was enforced, however, some viewed this as discrimination.

Name/surname spelling 
The official spelling of the all non-Lithuanian (hence Polish) name in a person's passport is governed by the 31 January 1991 Resolution of the Supreme Council of Lithuania No. I-1031 "Concerning name and surname spelling in the passport of the citizen of the Republic of Lithuania". There are the following options. The law says, in part:
2. In the passport of a citizen of the Republic of Lithuania, the first name and surname of persons of non-Lithuanian origin shall be spelt in Lithuanian. On the citizen's request in writing, the name and surname can be spelt in the order established as follows:

a) according to pronunciation and without grammatisation (i.e. without Lithuanian endings) or 
b) according to pronunciation alongside grammatisation (i.e. adding Lithuanian endings).

3. The names and surnames of the persons, who have already possessed citizenship of other State, shall be written according to the passport of the State or an equivalent document available in the passport of the Republic of Lithuania on its issue.

This resolution was challenged in 1999 in the Constitutional Court upon a civil case of a person of Polish ethnicity who requested his name to be entered in the passport in Polish. The Constitutional Court upheld the 1991 resolution. At the same time, it was stressed out citizen's rights to spell their name whatever they like in areas "not linked with the sphere of use of the state language pointed out in the law".

In 2022, the Seimas passed a law allowing members of ethnic minorities to use the full Latin alphabet, including q, w and x, letters which are not considered part of the Lithuanian alphabet, but not characters with diacritics (such as ł and ä), in their legal name if they declare their status as an ethnic minority and prove that their ancestors used that name. In response, several ethnically Polish Lithuanian politicians changed their legal names to be closer to the Polish spelling, most notably Justice Minister Ewelina Dobrowolska (formerly spelled "Evelina Dobrovolska"), but requests for name changes from the general population were low.

Organizations

The Electoral Action of Poles in Lithuania – Christian Families Alliance is an ethnic minority-based political party formed in 1994, able to exert significant political influence in the administrative districts where Poles form a majority or significant minority. This party has held seats in the Seimas (Parliament of Lithuania) for the past decade. In the 2020 Lithuanian parliamentary election it received just below 5% of the national vote. The party is more active in local politics and controls several municipal councils. It cooperates with other minorities, mainly the Lithuanian Russian Union.

The Association of Poles in Lithuania is an organization formed in 1989 to bring together Polish activists in Lithuania. It numbers between 6,000 and 11,000 members. Its work concerns the civil rights of the Polish minority and engages in educational, cultural, and economic activities.

Prominent Poles

Prior to 1940
 Gabriel Narutowicz – president of Poland
 Józef Piłsudski – Polish statesman
 Wiktor Budzyński – politician
 Kanuty Rusiecki – painter 
 Michał Pius Römer – lawyer 
 Sofija Pšibiliauskienė – writer
 Marija Lastauskienė – writer
 Medard Czobot – politician

Since 1990
 Anicet Brodawski – a Polish autonomist leader during the late 1980s
 Darjuš Lavrinovič – basketball player
 Kšyštof Lavrinovič – basketball player
 Artur Liudkovski – former deputy mayor of Vilnius
 Jarosław Niewierowicz – former minister of energy, former vice-minister of foreign affairs
 Czesław Okińczyc – politician, journalist
 Artur Płokszto – secretary of Ministry of National Defence
 Leokadia Poczykowska – politician
 Ewelina Saszenko – singer
 Jan Sienkiewicz –– politician, journalist
 Waldemar Tomaszewski – leader of Electoral Action of Poles in Lithuania – Christian Families Alliance
 Stanisław Widtmann (Stanislavas Vidtmannas) – (as of 2011) vice-minister of culture in ethnic minorities affairs.
 Jarosław Wołkonowski – dean of branch of University of Białystok in Vilnius
 Alina Orłowska – singer
 Michał Mackiewicz – politician
 Irena Litwinowicz – politician
 Zbigniew Balcewicz – politician

See also
 Lithuania–Poland relations
 Krajowcy
 Kresy
 Lithuanian minority in Poland
 Pochodnia, Polish cultural association in the interwar Lithuania
 Polish National Territorial Region

Notes

References

Bibliography

 

 

 
 

 

 
 
 
 
 

 Zbigniew Kurcz, "Mniejszość polska na Wileńszczyźnie", Wydawnictwo Uniwersytetu Wrocławskiego, Wrocław 2005, ISSN 0239-6661, .

External links

 Vitalija Stravinskienė, Poles In Lithuania From The Second Half Of 1944 Until 1946: Choosing Between Staying Or Emigrating To Poland, The Lithuanian Institute of History, January 19, 2006
 Chronology for Poles in Lithuania
 The Polish language in education in Lithuania
 Discrimination in Lithuania
 Observance of Polish minority rights in Lithuania Report by «Wspólnota Polska», Union of Poles in Lithuania and the Association of Teachers of Polish Schools in Lithuania, 2009
 The Polish national minority in Lithuania : three reports later.
 Organizacje Polonii na Litwie (Organizations of Polonia in Lithuania) 
 Polonia na świecie (Polonia worldwide) with section on Lithuania 
  (Poles in Lithuania)
 Losy ludności polskiej na Litwie (Fate of Polish population in Lithuania) 
 Jan Sienkiewicz, Przestrzeganie praw polskiej grupy etnicznej w Republice Litewskiej (Respecting the rights of the Polish minority in Lithuania) 
 Polacy na Litwie w prawie (Lithuanian law on minorities) 
 Srebrakowski A., Rozwój polskojęzycznej prasy na terenie Litwy po 1944 r.  
 Srebrakowski A., Szkolnictwo polskojęzyczne na Litwie 1944–1991 
 Srebrakowski A., Polacy w Litewskiej SRR 
 Srebrakowski A., Statystyczny obraz Polaków z Litwy.

Poles in Lithuania